Flesh Feast may refer to: 

Flesh Feat (film)
Flesh Feast (video game)